Kaohsiung Metro is a rapid transit and light rail system covering the metropolitan area of Kaohsiung, Taiwan. Its rapid transit network is known as Kaohsiung Mass Rapid Transit or Kaohsiung MRT. Construction of the MRT started in October 2001. The MRT opened in 2008 and the Circular light rail in 2015. Kaohsiung Metro is operated by the Kaohsiung Rapid Transit Corporation (KRTC) under a BOT contract the company signed with the Kaohsiung City Government.

In 2012, the two stations respectively are ranked as the 2nd and the 4th among the top 15 most beautiful subway stops in the world by BootsnAll.

The system uses romanizations derived from Tongyong Pinyin.

History
The Kaohsiung City Government undertook a feasibility study for constructing a rapid transit system in Kaohsiung in 1987. After finding favorable results, the city government began lobbying the Central Government for approval and funding. In 1990 approval was obtained to establish the Kaohsiung City Mass Rapid Transit Bureau and planning of the rapid transit network started. The first phase of the Kaohsiung Mass Rapid Transit System, the Red and Orange Lines, was approved in 1991, but disputes in funding shares between Kaohsiung City and County Governments stalled the project. The Kaohsiung City Mass Rapid Transit Bureau was officially established in 1994, to coincide with the project's move into the final scoping and detail design stages.

Work continued until 1996, when the Central Government ordered KMRT to look into constructing the project via the Build-Operate-Transfer (BOT) method. In 1999 the city government put out a request for the BOT contract to construct the first phase of the KMRT system. In 2000, out of the three consortia that submitted bids, Kaohsiung Rapid Transit Corporation (KRTC) was awarded the contract, receiving priority negotiating rights with the city government in constructing the system. KRTC obtained a company license and was registered in December 2000. In January 2001, KRTC signed the "Construction and Operation Agreement" and the "Development Agreement" with the Kaohsiung City Government, signaling the beginning of construction of the KMRT system. The main participants of the KRTC are: China Steel Corporation, Southeast Cement Corporation, RSEA Engineering Corporation, China Development Industrial Bank, and the Industrial Bank of Taiwan. The current system cost NT$181.3 (US$5.46 billion) to construct and includes a contract for 30 years of operation and maintenance. Construction costs were shared between the central government (79%), Kaohsiung City Government (19%), and Kaohsiung County Government (2%).

Construction began in October 2001, with 66 shield tunnels completed in May 2006. The cut-and-cover and bored tunnel methods were used for construction of the lines. In November 2006, the first trial runs began on the Red Line. In January 2007, the last concrete slabs were laid for the 37 planned stations.

Scandals and major construction accidents

In August 2004, a section of subway tunnel near Sizihwan metro station at the west end of the Orange line collapsed during construction due to loose sand underground and water break-ins. Four low-rise buildings near the collapsed tunnel had to be evacuated and later on had to be torn down due to major structure damages.

The Kaohsiung MRT Foreign Workers Scandal, involving alleged inhumane treatment of Thai migrant workers, erupted in 2005. Investigation revealed kickbacks to politicians by the contractor. The scandal had tainted the public confidence in the construction of the system and prompted a diplomatic response by the Thai Prime Minister asking the migrant workers to return to Thailand. Chen Chu, the Chairperson of the Council of Labor Affairs of the Executive Yuan, resigned as a result of the scandal.

In December 2005, another subway tunnel section of the Orange line at eastern Kaohsiung collapsed during construction. The collapse of the subway tunnel also brought about the collapse of a road tunnel above the subway tunnel. Several nearby buildings were evacuated for several days for inspection. It was estimated that the road tunnel could not be rebuilt and reopened for traffic for at least a few months. In January 2008 the section was still closed and traffic is diverted around the affected area.

Opening
Construction accidents delayed the opening of the MRT considerably from the originally planned December 2006 date.  The Sanduo-Siaogang section of the Red Line was eventually opened to the public for free test rides during 8–11 February 2008, and the Red Line (except for 2 stations) opened for service on 9 March 2008.  The Orange Line fully opened for service on 14 September 2008.

Ridership
Ridership has been far below expectations, with an average of 100,000 passengers per day versus an expected 360,000, and accumulated losses are expected to reach NT$6 billion by the end of 2009.

, the average daily ridership stands at about 178,975, with ridership figures significantly greater on weekends than on weekdays. During New Year's Eve on 31 December 2012, the system transported 472,378 passengers. KRTC stated that ridership would need to exceed 380,000 passengers per day in order to break even.

Unopened Stations
The R1, R2, and O3 stations were planned originally but never built. The R1 and R2 stations were cancelled before construction, and O3 was cancelled due to a fire at the original station location.

Routes

Kaohsiung Metro is made up of the Red Line and Orange Line with 37 stations covering a distance of
. 27 of these stations are underground, with 8 elevated and 2 at-grade level. All underground stations have full height platform screen doors.

 Kaohsiung Metro route table:
 In operation: Main lines: 3, Extensions: 0
 Planned: Main lines: 9, Extensions: 6
 Total routes: Main lines: 11, Extension: 6
 Terminated: Main line: 1, Extensions: 1

Red line

Then the route passes through Banpingshan, extends along Zuonan Road to Nanzih Export Processing Zone, and continues into parts of the city formerly part of Kaohsiung County. The route finally passes along the Gaonan Highway to Ciaotou District and the southern border area of Gangshan District. The Red line (excluding Gangshan South Station) commenced passenger service on 9 March 2008. Gangshan South station was opened for passenger service on 23 December 2012.

Orange line

From the west, the Orange line starts at Sizihwan (Linhai 2nd Road), crosses the track yard of TRA Kaohsiung Port Station and follows Dayong Road, passing through Love River. The route then follows Jhongjheng Road as it passes by Kaohsiung City Council, Dagangpu Circle, Cultural Center, Martial Arts Stadium, and the Weiwuying Park planning site before entering parts of the city formerly part of Kaohsiung County. The route continues along Zihyou Road, Guangyuan Road and Jhongshan East Road in Fengshan District to Daliao District. All stations are underground except Daliao Station, which is at ground level. A single depot has been built beside Daliao station to serve the line. The Orange Line commenced passenger service on 14 September 2008.

Circular light rail

The Circular LRT Line (aka Kaohsiung LRT, Kaohsiung Tram) for Kaohsiung is a light rail line. Construction of Phase I, C1 Kaisyuan to C14 Sizhihwan began in June 2013. Phase I had operations in September 2017.

A temporary light rail system for demonstration purposes, with just 2 stations, was built in the Central Park in 2004, using Melbourne D2 Tram cars from Siemens. As it was simply for demonstration purposes, it was closed soon after, and is no longer operational.

Expansion projects

Kaohsiung Metro is expected to be extended further into parts of Greater Kaohsiung, as well as Pingtung County.

Active projects 
Alongside a twin-track tunnel, it will construct five commuter stations—Fine Arts Museum, Gushan, Sankuaicuo, Minzu and National Science and Technology Museum —as well as move underground Kaohsiung Station (R11 Station of Kaohsiung Metro included). The Fengshan Project is the Kaohsiung project extension to Fengshan. The project includes adding one new underground commuter station Zhengyi/Chengqing station and the Fengshan Station underground. The Duration for the project is from 2006 to 2018. In 2016, subsequent works are under way on stations, tunnels and rail tracks.

All projects

Rolling stock

The rolling stock is based on the Siemens Modular Metro design manufactured by Siemens Mobility. Trains run in 3 car sets (though platforms are designed to be able to accommodate up to 6 car sets, with the exception of Kaohsiung Main Station of only 3 car accommodations) and are powered by third rail. Seats are arranged parallel to the windows, unlike their Taipei Metro counterparts. LED displays are installed above every alternate door (other doors show the route map), showing the name of the current station and next station in Chinese and English. Automated announcements are made in Mandarin, Taiwanese (with the exception of  since no Taiwanese translation for the name is available), Hakka, and English, with Japanese announcements at the major stations. The train has AC traction motors with IGBT–VVVF inverters powered by Siemens.

Fares and ticketing

The fares of KMRT is distance-based, with a minimum of NT$20 for trips within . The maximum fare on Red Line is NT$60, from Siaogang Station to Ciaotou Station.

One way fare is ticketed with an RFID IC token. In addition to the RFID IC token, there are four kinds of contactless smart card are accepted by the system. The iPASS card was the only card that could be deducted before 1 July 2016. After 1 July 2016, EasyCard, iCash2.0, HappyCash are accepted by the system.

Ridership

Art
Kaohsiung Arena Station, Formosa Boulevard Station, and Kaohsiung International Airport Station feature artworks integrated into the design of the station by international artists.

Facilities and services
Platform screen doors were supplied by ST Electronics have been installed at all underground stations. LCD television units have also been installed on platform doors for the broadcast of train information and advertisements. All stations are wheelchair accessible.

K.R.T. Girls 

The K.R.T. Girls are four anime-styled characters that serve as mascots for the Kaohsiung Metro.

See also
Kaohsiung Rapid Transit Corporation
List of metro systems
Rail transport in Taiwan
Taipei Metro

Notes

References

External links

Kaohsiung Future LRT Network Map

Mass Rapid Transit Bureau of Kaohsiung City Government

Underground rapid transit in Taiwan
Build–operate–transfer
 
2008 establishments in Taiwan
Standard gauge railways in Taiwan
Rail transport articles in need of updating
Railway lines opened in 2008